Rory Skinner (born 27 September 2001) is a championship winning British motorcycle racer from Perth, Scotland, who also works as a motorcycle mechanic. After the 2019 season in British Supersport on a Kawasaki, for 2020 he moved to Appleyard Yamaha racing. Skinner dominated the 2020 British Supersport Championship, winning the first six races, and was crowned champion after his eighth victory of the season.

For 2021 and 2022, Skinner moved into the British Superbike Championship. He missed the last two 2022 rounds due to a hand injury sustained when he crashed into the back of another rider in late September.

For 2023 and 2024, Skinner is contracted to race in the Moto2 world championship with American Racing Team.

Skinner was the inaugural champion of the British Talent Cup, a motorcycle racing series for young riders. He is a former race winner in the Red Bull MotoGP Rookies Cup, as well as the 2014 Dunlop Aprilia Superteens Champion and a multiple mini-moto champion.

Skinner is managed by former MotoGP rider John Hopkins.

Career

Red Bull MotoGP Rookies Cup
On 17 October 2014, the then 13-year-old Skinner was selected as the only British rider to compete in the 2015 Red Bull MotoGP Rookies Cup, following the selection event at the Guadix circuit in Spain.

Skinner ended his debut season in the championship in 10th position, with his best results coming at the final round in Aragon, Spain. On the weekend of his 14th birthday, Skinner qualified on pole position and took third place in each of the two races. It was also confirmed that he would continue in the championship in 2016.

Despite missing the first round of the 2016 championship through injury, Skinner moved up to sixth in the overall standings - scoring third place podium finishes at Assen and Aragon.

The Scot took his first and only Rookies win in the opening race of the 2017 season at Jerez. It was his only podium finish of the season and he slipped back to 12th in the final standings.

At the end of 2017 it was confirmed that he was leaving the Red Bull MotoGP Rookies Cup, having competed in the maximum three seasons allowed under the rules.

FIM CEV Moto3 Junior World Championship
As well as competing in the Red Bull Rookies MotoGP Cup, Skinner raced in the FIM CEV Moto3 Junior World Championship for the KRP team, as part of the Racing Steps Foundation programme.

Riding a KTM motorcycle, the Scot scored a best result of fifth and finished 13th in the 2017 FIM CEV Moto3 Junior World Championship.

British Talent Cup
With his time in the Red Bull Rookies complete and Racing Steps Foundation closing its doors, Skinner found himself without a ride for 2018. He was handed a lifeline when Dorna offered him a place in the inaugural British Talent Cup, despite him not having officially applied to join the series. Skinner was fastest in the pre-season test at the Valencia circuit in Spain, and took his first win at the second round in Donington Park.

On 17 November 2018 Skinner became the inaugural British Talent Cup champion at the Valencia circuit in Spain.

British Supersport Championship

For 2019, British Superbike Championship veteran Chris Walker provided Skinner with a Kawasaki ZX-6R for his privateer campaign. In a team run by his father Mike, the 18-year-old finished the season seventh overall, making him the top ranked rookie and best placed Kawasaki rider. His best result was a third place at Donington Park.

For 2020, Skinner was signed by former Grand Prix racer Robin Appleyard to ride a Yamaha R6, and he dominated the championship. He won the first six races in a row, and secured the championship with two races to spare at Donington Park on 4 October 2020, becoming the series' youngest ever champion at 19 years and seven days old.

British Superbike Championship

On 28 November 2020 it was announced that Skinner would move up to the British Superbike Championship in 2021, riding for the FS-3 Kawasaki team. In July, Skinner recorded his first podium finishes when twice finishing runner-up at Knockhill.

In 2022 season he was the third rider to qualify for the end of season 'Showdown' and, at 20 years old, the youngest Title Fighter in the championship's history. He was unable to challenge for the title due to injuries and missed the last two rounds with a broken hand sustained when he crashed into the back of another rider at Oulton Park.

Moto2 World Championship

2022
In 2022, Skinner had two wildcard rides in the Moto2 world championship, organised by John Hopkins with his American Racing team.

2023–
In October 2022 Skinner signed to race in the Moto2 world championship for the American Racing team during 2023 and 2024.

Career statistics

British Supersport Championship

Races by year
(key) (Races in bold indicate pole position; races in italics indicate fastest lap) 

** Season limited to 12 races because of COVID-19 pandemic.

British Superbike Championship
(key) (Races in bold indicate pole position; races in italics indicate fastest lap)

Moto2 World Championship

Races by year
(key) (Races in bold indicate pole position; races in italics indicate fastest lap)

References

External links 

 Profile on British Superbike Championship
 Profile on British Talent Cup
 Profile on Red Bull MotoGP Rookies (Archived)
 

Scottish motorcycle racers
2001 births
Living people
Sportspeople from Perth, Scotland
People educated at Perth High School
British Supersport Championship riders
British Superbike Championship riders
Moto2 World Championship riders